The 2020 UAE Tour was a road cycling stage race that took place between 23 and 27 February 2020 in the United Arab Emirates (initially scheduled to take place between the 23 and 29 February). It was the second edition of the UAE Tour and the third race of the 2020 UCI World Tour.

The race was held during the COVID-19 pandemic, and following the fifth stage, two staff members of one of the teams tested positive for COVID-19.
In response, the local authorities quarantined and tested all participants, including riders, organisers and team members, and cancelled the remaining two stages. As of March 3, 2020, most teams had left the country and returned to their normal early season schedules, but some teams were still being held within the UAE with very little explanation or assurances. They were eventually told they would be allowed to leave their hotel on March 14.

Yates took the race leader's jersey following the third stage, one of the two mountain-top finishes on Jebel Hafeet, taking a clear stage victory with over a minute's advantage over Tadej Pogačar and maintained his lead during the second mountainous stage, won by Pogačar, who was ultimately classified second in the general classification and took the white jersey for the young riders' classification. Alexey Lutsenko of  completed the podium, over a minute and a half behind Yates, thanks to strong finishes on the two mountainous stages.

Among the race's other jerseys, in addition to Pogačar taking the young rider's classification, Caleb Ewan of  collected the most points in the points classification thanks to a win on the second stage and consistently high finishes on the other flat stages.

Teams
Twenty teams were invited to the event, including eighteen of the nineteen UCI WorldTeams and two UCI Professional Continental teams. Each team consisted of seven riders for a total of 140 riders, of which 133 finished.

UCI WorldTeams

 
 
 
 
 
 
 
 
 
 
 
 
 
 
 
 
 
 

UCI Professional Continental teams

Route

Stages

Stage 1
23 February 2020 – The Pointe at Palm Jumeirah to Dubai Silicon Oasis,

Stage 2
24 February 2020 – Hatta to Hatta Dam,

Stage 3
25 February 2020 – Al Qudrah Cycle Track to Jebel Hafeet,

Stage 4
26 February 2020 – Zabeel Park to Dubai City Walk,

Stage 5
27 February 2020 – Al Ain to Jebel Hafeet,

Stage 6
28 February 2020 – Al Ruwais to Al Mirfa, 

The stage was cancelled by local authorities when two staff members tested positive for COVID-19.

Stage 7
29 February 2020 – Al Maryah Island to Abu Dhabi, 

The stage was cancelled by local authorities when two staff members tested positive for COVID-19.

Classification leadership table

Classification standings

General classification

Points classification

Sprints classification

Young rider classification

Teams classification

Notes

References

External links
 Official website

2020
2020 UCI World Tour
2020 in Emirati sport
February 2020 sports events in Asia
Sports events curtailed due to the COVID-19 pandemic